Senaka Rajapakse (born 1966) is a Sri Lankan academic, researcher and clinician. He is senior professor and chair of medicine, University of Colombo, Sri Lanka and the director of the Postgraduate Institute of Medicine, Sri Lanka.

Education 

Senaka Rajapakse graduated (MBBS 1993, MD 1999) from the Faculty of Medicine, University of Colombo in 1993. He became a member of the Royal College of Physicians in 2003. He completed postgraduate training  in General (Internal) Medicine and Intensive care at National University Hospital, Singapore.

Educational and Professional Activities 

Senaka Rajapakse is a consultant physician in general (internal) medicine in department of medicine, University of Colombo and honorary consultant at University medical unit, National Hospital of Sri Lanka. He is a Fellow of the Royal College of Physicians of London and Edinburgh, the American College of Physicians, the Ceylon College of Physicians, and the National Academy of Sciences of Sri Lanka. He was President of the Ceylon College of Physicians for 2021, Past-President of Sri Lanka College of Internal Medicine. He is the Regional Adviser for Colombo to the Royal College of Physicians of Edinburgh. He is co-editor of the Ceylon Medical Journal   and is on the editorial board of several journals. He has supervised and trained numerous specialist medical trainees and research students. He is the founder member of the Hypertensive society in Sri Lanka and many other medical societies in Sri Lanka. He introduced virtual learning to medical faculty Colombo, obtaining funding and developing virtual learning material for student and lecturers.

Research 

Since the early days of his medical career he has been involved in research, initially on yellow oleander poisoning, and then tropical infections such as dengue fever, malaria, and leptospirosis. He has  collaborated with Oxford University research teams. In addition to the research papers, books and multimedia publications, he has contributed to a widely used medical book, Kumar and Clark's 9th edition. He has an H-index of 38, with over 4500 citations.

Rajapakse  has won numerous research awards, including many Presidential Awards for research, the National Science Foundation Research Award for Scientific Excellence in 2017, the University of Colombo award for Excellence in Research 2002, 2011, & 2015, and the Vice Chancellor’s Award for Excellence in research 2017.  He was awarded the CVCD (Committee of Vice-Chancellors and Directors, Sri Lanka) Most Outstanding Senior Researcher in Health Sciences Award in 2016, which is a lifetime award for excellence in research.

Publications 
Samarakoon L, Fernando T, Rodrigo C, Rajapakse S. Learning styles and approaches to learning among medical undergraduates and postgraduates. BMC medical education. 2013 Dec;13(1):1-6. (Cited 308 times, according to Google Scholar  ) 
Rajapakse S, Rodrigo C, Rajapakse A. Atypical manifestations of chikungunya infection. Transactions of the Royal Society of Tropical Medicine and Hygiene. 2010 Feb 1;104(2):89-96. (Cited 218 times, according to Google Scholar.)  
Fernando D, Rodrigo C, Rajapakse S. Primaquine in vivax malaria: an update and review on management issues. Malaria journal. 2011 Dec;10(1):1-2.(Cited 174 times, according to Google Scholar.)

Books 

 Handbook of Critical Care 2009. 
 Case discussions in critical care 2009. 
 HIV and Women. 
 Update on four tropical infectious diseases.
 MCQs in Cardiovascular Medicine.
 A Guide to Internship in Medicine.
 A Primer of Geriatric Medicine, An introduction to geriatric medicine.
 A Manual for Developing E-Learning Material.
 National Hypertension Guidelines – Sri Lanka 2003

Professional affiliations and honors 

 President, Sri Lankan College of Internal Medicine 2018
 President, Ceylon College of Physicians 2021
 Fellow, Royal College of Physicians of Edinburgh – 2010
 Fellow, Royal College of Physicians, London Membership
 Fellow, American College of Physicians
 Fellow, Ceylon College of Physicians
 Co-editor, National Hypertension Guidelines Committee, 2001-2003
 Fellow of National Academy of Science Sri Lanka

References

External links 

 https://med.cmb.ac.lk/
 http://www.nhsl.health.gov.lk/web/index.php?lang=en
 https://nassl.org/
 https://cmj.sljol.info/
 https://www.ccp.lk/
 https://slcim.lk/
 https://cmb.ac.lk/noc/
 https://scholar.google.com/citations?user=HXOWjB8AAAAJ&hl=en
 https://med.cmb.ac.lk/clinmed/research/

Living people
Sri Lankan medical doctors
Sri Lankan medical researchers
Alumni of the University of Colombo
Academic staff of the University of Colombo
1966 births
Medical journal editors
Fellows of the Royal Society of Medicine
Fellows of the American College of Physicians
Fellows of the Royal College of Physicians of Edinburgh